Giorgos Mitsikostas (born 12 October 1968) is a famous Greek comedic impressionist in Greece.

Biography
He started his professional career by impersonating Greek public figures, mainly sports people (e.g. famous sportscaster Giannis Diakogiannis and Filippas Sirigos) and politicians (prime ministers Konstantinos Karamanlis and Andreas Papandreou) on radio satiric shows on FM Radio station "Athens 98.4". The name of his show had the -completely- random title, "The conspirators of the night, in the conspiracy of the patsas" (Greek: Οι συνωμότες της νύχτας, στη συνωμοσία του πατσά), in which his co-presenator was, the later well-known TV presenter, Nikos Evaggelatos.

But he was doing amateur radio shows some time before as university student (in the Buness Management department of AUEB) on college radio. His debut on TV was in 1990. Since then he has been on many Greek channels, and afterwards started to impersonate actors, singers and journalists as well, and changed the form of his shows. All of the titles of his shows are a word play, usually with his name.

It is said that sometimes when a Greek celebrity called a restaurant or a hotel to book a seat, the persons on the other end of the line thought it was Mitsikostas making pranks. Mitsikostas has admitted he has done such things in the past.

There is a famous political anecdote concerning the Greek politician and former prime minister of Greece for many years Andreas Papandreou, who upon first hearing the then mostly unknown Mitsikostas imitating him on the radio having a conversation with leader of the then opposition and also former Prime Minister Konstantinos Karamanlis, called his minister, alarmed about a scam being raised against his party by imposters.

Mitsikostas also impersonates sports people from Greece. Such persons include Giorgos Georgiou, Kostas Karamanlis, Vassilios Tsiartas, Giorgos Karagounis, Nikos Alefantos, Konstantinos Mitsotakis, Dušan Bajević, Kostas Kazakos, Sakis Rouvas, Vassilis Leventis, Antonios Nikopolidis, Sotiris Ninis, Dimitris Ververelis and Adonis Georgiades.

TV shows

 Pitsi Pitsi me to Mitsi - Πίτσι Πίτσι με το Μίτσι ('chit-chat with Mitsi') on Mega Channel - 1992
 FTYSTOUS - Φτύστους (both 'spit them' and 'identical' in Greek) on Alpha TV (a Greek version of Spitting Image with puppets) - 1994
 TRELLAS - Τρελλάς (a mixture of 'Hellas' and the Greek word for 'folly' on Alpha TV - 1995
 Tatsi-mitsi-kosta - Τάτσι-μίτσι-κόστα on ANT1 - 1996
 MitsiHosta - Μιτσι Χώστα (a wordplay roughly meaning 'Bash them, MitsiKosta') on Alter Channel (2001–2006)
 The Da Mitsi Code - Κώδικας Ντα Μίτσι (2006–2007)
 O Giorgos Sfirikse - Ο Γιώργος Σφύριξε (2008–2009)
 Mhtsi Show on Epsilon TV (2013-2014)
 The Mitsi Show on ERT1 (2018)

Filmography

Sources and external links
Official site
 
 at retrodb.gr

References 

1965 births
Living people
Greek impressionists (entertainers)
Greek television presenters
Greek comedians
People from Athens